Medra railway station is a railway station on Ahmedabad–Udaipur Line under the Ahmedabad railway division of Western Railway zone. This is situated beside National Highway 8 at Valad in Gandhinagar district of the Indian state of Gujarat.

References

Ahmedabad railway division
Railway stations in Gandhinagar district